Scrupocellaria is a genus of bryozoans belonging to the family Candidae.

The genus has cosmopolitan distribution.

Species:

Scrupocellaria aegeensis 
Scrupocellaria appendiculata 
Scrupocellaria brendolensis 
Scrupocellaria crenulata 
Scrupocellaria delilii 
Scrupocellaria dubia 
Scrupocellaria elliptica 
Scrupocellaria gracilis 
Scrupocellaria harmeri 
Scrupocellaria incurvata 
Scrupocellaria inermis 
Scrupocellaria intermedia 
Scrupocellaria jullieni 
Scrupocellaria minor 
Scrupocellaria minuta 
Scrupocellaria montecchiensis 
Scrupocellaria muricata 
Scrupocellaria prolifera 
Scrupocellaria puelcha 
Scrupocellaria rostrata 
Scrupocellaria scrupea 
Scrupocellaria scruposa 
Scrupocellaria vaughani

References

Bryozoan genera